René-Levasseur Island is a large island in the centre of Lake Manicouagan in Quebec, Canada.  Its highest peak is Mount Babel, at 952 m (3,123 feet), which is contained in the Louis-Babel Ecological Reserve. With a total area of 2,020 km2 (and a diameter of 50.7 km), the island is larger in area than the annular lake in which it is situated. René-Levasseur Island is the world's second largest lake island (the largest is Manitoulin Island in Lake Huron).

The geological structure was formed by the impact of a meteorite 214 million years ago. The meteorite is believed to have been about 5 km in diameter, and would have hit Earth at a speed of 17 km/s, the fifth most powerful known impact that Earth has seen. The impact of the meteorite formed a crater roughly 100 km in diameter, the centre of which forms the island known today. It became an artificial island when the Manicouagan reservoir was flooded in 1970, merging two crescent-shaped lakes: Mouchalagane Lake on the western side and Manicouagan Lake on the eastern side.

Hydro-Québec's Daniel-Johnson dam on the Manicouagan River, which created the Manicouagan Reservoir is the world's largest multiple-arch dam.

The Manicouagan Reservoir and René-Levasseur Island are sometimes called the "eye of Quebec".

The island is currently the subject of an ongoing legal battle, as the Innu First Nation of Betsiamites is taking legal action to protect its indigenous land from logging. The Quebec Court of Appeal made a ruling on April 28, 2006, allowing Kruger Inc. to resume its logging activities.

The island is also the object of an environmental/ecological campaign lobbying the government of Québec to create a protected area spanning the entire island. The group, SOS Levasseur arose in 2003 partly from the interest that mainstream environmental groups in Québec demonstrated during environmental consultations. All groups recommended that René-Levasseur Island be protected in its entirety. The Island has been proposed as a Canadian National Park, an ecological reserve, a biodiversity reserve and an exceptional geological site. There seems to be an exceptional concentration of old-growth boreal forest stands on the island.

SOS Levasseur has been conducting research expeditions to the island since January 2005, whose aim is to identify old-growth forest stands and to obtain their protection under the Quebec Forest Law as Exceptional Forest Ecosystems (EFE).

The Ministry of Natural Resources and Fauna (MRNFQ), along with Kruger Inc. have already Identified 7 EFEs spanning approximately 25 km2. SOS Levasseur has submitted an additional 7 surveyed in the summer of 2005 and is expected to submit many more from the 2006 and 2007 expeditions.

The MRNFQ has yet to recognize the seven sites proposed by SOS Levasseur.

Image gallery

References

See also
 List of islands of Quebec

Landforms of Côte-Nord
Lake islands of Quebec
Artificial islands of Quebec